The Intrépida class is a class of fast attack craft that was built by Lürssen for the Argentine Navy in the early 1970s. The ships are based on Lürssen's TNC 45 design.

Operational history 
As of 2021 Intrépida was reported active and participated in a sea exercise with the destroyer Sarandi, the corvettes Espora, Spiro, Robinson and Gómez Roca and with aircraft from Argentine naval aviation.

Both vessels were reported active on exercises in 2022.

Ships in the class 
 ARA Intrépida (P-85)
 ARA Indómita (P-86)

See also 
 Albatros-class fast attack craft (Type 143)
 Gepard-class fast attack craft (Type 143A)
 Tiger-class fast attack craft (Type 148)
 Sa'ar 4-class missile boat (Reshef)

References

Notes

Bibliography
 Guia de los buques de la Armada Argentina 2005-2006. Ignacio Amendolara Bourdette, Editor n/a. (Spanish/English text)

Further reading

External links
 Argentine Navy official site, specifications and brief history  (in Spanish)

 
Ships built in Bremen (state)
Missile boat classes